Viterbo is a city and comune in Lazio, Italy.

Viterbo may also refer to:

Places
Viterbo, Caldas, a town in Caldas, Colombia
Viterbo, Texas, an unincorporated community in Jefferson County, Texas, United States

People with the surname
 Dina Tiktiner Viterbo (1918-2001), French fashion designer
José Viterbo (born 1962), Portuguese football manager
Patricia Viterbo (1939–1966), French actress

Other uses
Viterbo University, a university in La Crosse, Wisconsin, United States